The 1984 ARFU Asian Rugby Championship was the 9th edition of the tournament, and was played in Fukuoka, Japan. The final match was held between the winners of the two pools, and the third-place match between the runners-up Japan won the tournament.

Tournament

Pool A

Pool B

Finals

Third Place Final

First Place Final

References

1984
1984 rugby union tournaments for national teams
International rugby union competitions hosted by Japan
rugby union